Xylocopa inconstans is a species of carpenter bee.

Description

The scutellum has a right angle. The back side of the mesosoma and the first tergite show a white pubescence.

Distribution
This species can be found in Senegal, Burkina-Faso, Togo, Cameroon, RCongo, DRCongo, Sudan, Somalia, Ethiopia, Kenya, Tanzania, Mozambique, Malawi, Zimbabwe, Angola, Botswana, Namibia and South Africa.

References 

Eardley, C. D. (1987) Catalogue of Apoidea (Hymenoptera) in Africa south of the Sahara, Part 1, The genus Xylocopa Latreille (Anthophoridae), Entomology Memoir, No. 70

inconstans
Insects described in 1874